William Wilberforce Newton (4 November 1843 – 1914) was an American Episcopalian divine and author.

Life
Born 1843 in Philadelphia, Pennsylvania to Richard Newton and Lydia Gretorex, Newton studied at the University of Pennsylvania graduating in 1865.  In 1863 he had served in the Civil War as a private. He attended the Episcopal Divinity School in Philadelphia before taking up his ministry.

From 1866 to 1870 he was assistant rector at the Church of The Epiphany, Philadelphia, and from 1877 to 1882 minister at the Cathedral Church of St. Paul, Boston.

In 1890 Newton was awarded an honorary DD by his alma mater.

Newton died in Brookline, Massachusetts in 1914

References

External links
 Carpe Viam, class poem of class of 1865 University of Pennsylvania by Newton

1843 births
1914 deaths
Clergy from Philadelphia
People of Pennsylvania in the American Civil War
University of Pennsylvania alumni